Pantone is a corporation headquartered in Carlstadt, New Jersey, USA, that makes the Pantone Matching System Color Guides. 

Pantone may also refer to:

Dan James Pantone, an American ecologist and conservationist

See also
Panettone - a type of Italian Christmas sweet bread loaf.
Pantone Tria markers
Panton (disambiguation)